This is a list of notable nationally exposed mascots and characters created specifically for advertising purposes, listed alphabetically by the product they represent.

Characters

Other notable characters and their brands
 Betty Boop (1930–1992) – Paramount Pictures (former)
 Brawny Lumberjack – Brawny paper towels
 Brother Dominick – Xerox
 Culligan Lady – Culligan water softener
 Gamzee Makara – Faygo
 Felix the Cat (1919–1921) – DreamWorks Classics (former)
 Foster Farm Chickens – Foster Farms poultry
 Fruit of The Loom Guys – Fruit of The Loom underwear/sleepwear
 The Hasbro Boy – Hasbro
 John H. Goodwill – Goodwill thrift store
 Kenner Gooney Bird – Kenner
 Klondike The Polar Bear – Klondike ice cream bar
 Little Foster – Foster’s Freeze restaurants
 Little Miss Sunbeam – Sunbeam bread
 Luxo Jr. – Pixar
 Mia (Native American woman) – Land O'Lakes butter and dairy products
 The Minions – Illumination Entertainment
 Mr. Bluelight – K-Mart stores
 Mr. Bubble – Mr. Bubble bubble bath
 Mr. Goodwin – Crest toothpaste
 Mr. Meow – Meow Mix cat food
 Mr. Potato Head and Mrs. Potato Head – Lays chips
 Mrs. Olson – Folgers coffee
 Orville Redenbacher – Orville Redenbacher gourmet popcorn
 Oscar Mayer Bologny Kid – Oscar Mayer bologna
 Pikachu – Pokémon merchandise
 Polar Bear – Icee drinks
 Popeye (1930–1988) – Paramount Pictures (former)
 Punchy – Hawaiian Punch drink mix
 Rosie The Waitress – Bounty paper towels
 Sambo & Jolly Tiger – Sambo’s restaurants
 Scrat – Blue Sky Studios
 Slappy the Dummy – Goosebumps merchandise
 Sleepy Bear – Travelodge motels
 Slush Puppie – Slush Puppie drinks
 SpongeBob SquarePants – Nickelodeon
 The Cat in the Hat - Dr. Seuss Enterprises
 Talking T-Shirt – Adidas sportswear
 Tropic-Ana – Tropicana orange juice
 Mr. Magoo – DreamWorks Classics
 W.C. Fritos – Frito Lay corn chips
 Woody Woodpecker – Universal Studios

See also
 List of Australian and New Zealand advertising characters
 List of European and British advertising characters

References

Further reading
 
 

American
Characters
Advertising characters
Advertising characters
Advertising characters